Inwood Hill Park is a public park in the Inwood neighborhood of Manhattan, New York City, operated by the New York City Department of Parks and Recreation. Unlike other Manhattan parks, Inwood Hill Park is largely natural and consists of mostly wooded, non-landscaped hills.

History

Site 

Inwood Hill Park has a human history that goes back to the Pre-Columbian era. Through the 17th century, Native Americans known as the Wecquaesgeek inhabited the area. There is evidence of a main encampment along the eastern edge of the park, known as the village of Shorakapok. The Wecquaesgeek relied on both the Hudson and Harlem Rivers as sources for food. Artifacts and the remains of old campfires were found in Inwood's rock shelters, suggesting their use for shelter and temporary living quarters.

Fort Cockhill, one of many forts built in New York by the Continental Army during the Revolutionary War, stood in the northwestern  extremity of the Park. A small, five-sided earthen structure equipped with two cannons, it overlooked the mouth of Spuyten Duyvil Creek, at its confluence with the Hudson River. At the time, the area was known from Colonial to post–Revolutionary War times as Cox's Hill or Tubby Hook Hill.

Even though the area which is now Inwood Hill Park was the site of one of the last farms in Manhattan – which lasted to at least c. 1890 – by the 19th century it was largely the location of country retreats for some of the wealthier families of the community and the rest of New York's social elite. One such notable who had a summer estate in Inwood was Isidor Straus, co-owner of the Macy's department store and a passenger on the ill-fated voyage of the RMS Titanic. The Lords of the Lord & Taylor department store chain owned two mansions built within the park; both mansions were destroyed by fire in the latter part of the 19th century. Additionally, an orphanage was located high on a bluff in what is now Inwood Hill Park in the nineteenth century. The site today includes a small paved area and park benches; no trace of the building remains. At least three freshwater springs arise in the park, one of which was used for drinking water by the workers who constructed the Henry Hudson Bridge. Some land in the north was formerly known as Cold Spring.

Historically, the area now encompassed by Inwood Hill Park has been largely unaffected by development.

Use as park 

Andrew Haswell Green, who was in charge of the Central Park Commission, and responsible for laying out the streets on the Upper West Side and in Upper Manhattan, first suggested that a park be created in Inwood in 1895.  His idea did not gain traction quickly, but the discovery of archeological finds in the area, the unique geology of the hill, historical associations (both true and merely rumored), the inherent beauty of the landscape and the views to be seen from it finally brought the city around, and between 1915 and the early 1940s, it purchased parcels of land that make up the park as it is today.

The park was officially opened on May 8, 1926.  Squatters who lived in the abandoned estates around the perimeter of the park were removed in the 1930s by Robert Moses and the Works Project Administration.  The WPA also paved over some trails and illuminated them with lampposts, many of which are now in need of repair. Arson and dumping have damaged the park and its integrity, as have erosion-control measures which were not well conceived.

In 1992, the central old-growth forest area was designated as Shorakapok Preserve, after the indigenous settlement there.

On September 15, 1995, the Inwood Hill Nature Center was dedicated and opened to the public. It is located near the park entrance on 218th Street and Indian Road, and is on a peninsula that was formerly connected to the Bronx mainland before the digging of the Harlem River Ship Canal. The center is located on Manhattan's only salt-water marsh, and has been designated as an interactive exhibit with ongoing monitoring of the natural area. It is also the focal point to watch the eagles that have been placed in the park to be freed when they are able to adjust to the environment.

Great Tulip Tree and Shorakapok Rock 

The park's Shorakapok Preserve was formerly the site of a "Great Tulip Tree", a Liriodendron tulipifera considered the largest tree on Manhattan, as well as one of the oldest, and was championed and restored by Parks Commissioner Charles Bunstein Stover. As part of care for the tree, a plaque was put up connecting it to Hudson's voyages, a couple of years after the Hudson–Fulton Celebration, commemorating the 300th anniversary of Hudson's work and the 100th anniversary of Fulton's. The original plaque also connected the tree to Native American archaeological finds nearby, speculating that some of the Native Americans at Shorakapok could have interacted with Hudson. Hudson actually engaged in a battle from his ship with Native Americans at nearby Nipinichsen, just north of Spuyten Duyvil Creek, on October 2, 1609. The tree survived for centuries until it was felled by a storm in 1933. 

Until the 1950s the stump was still to be seen, surrounded by a large iron fence, but as it rotted it was finally removed and a boulder and plaque replaced it. Peter Minuit Post 1247 of the American Legion placed the boulder and the plaque in 1954, commemorating the 300th anniversary of New Amsterdam gaining municipal rights a year earlier. The plaque labels the boulder "Shorakkopoch" (a more recent Parks Department sign nearby calls it "Shorakapok Rock"), and claims that "according to legend" this is where Minuit negotiated the purchase of Manhattan Island from Native Americans. The account does not appear in any historical records, and some historians place any such meeting location in Lower Manhattan. The association of a "treaty tree" in different locations with land acquisition has been noted as a common myth that promotes a narrative of peaceful colonial settlement.

Geography
The Henry Hudson Parkway and Amtrak's Empire Connection railroad line run through it, and at its northern end the Henry Hudson Bridge and the rail-only Spuyten Duyvil Bridge link Manhattan to the Bronx.

The park's western boundary is the Hudson River, and the southern boundary is Dyckman Street. From Dyckman Street to 204th Street the eastern boundary is Payson Avenue, from 204th to 214th Street it is Seaman Avenue, and from 215th Street to the park's end at 218th Street the eastern boundary is Indian Road.  footpaths criss-cross the park, allowing easy access to Dyckman Street, Fort Tryon Park, Fort Washington Park, and Riverside Park – part of the Manhattan Waterfront Greenway. Some of these trails are former roads leading to what were once summer estates that later were brought under the control of the city in the creation of the park. Bolton Road, which was the main drive to the Bolton estate, is now the primary pedestrian pathway within the park; its entrance marked by a sign located on Payson Avenue.

Inwood Hill Park is geologically diverse, with marble, schist, and limestone all prevalent in the area. The park is next to the seismologically active Dyckman Street Fault which runs parallel along the southern border of the park. As recently as 1989, activity of this fault caused a magnitude 2 earthquake.

Economic Impact 

Urban parks have a significant economic impact on surrounding communities. The development and evolution of Inwood Park's flora and fauna are intrinsically linked to the financial stability of New York City and its residents. Fiscal investments of the state have a significant impact on the health and species diversity of flora and fauna in New York city parks. During the New York Fiscal crisis in the 1970s, the New York state government decided it would be prudent to cut funding for the maintenance of New York parks and redistribute the money to other areas of public and private services. Consequently, many public workers in New York City parks were laid off due to this decision. The Protected Native Plants Program was created in 1989 to provide regulatory protection for native New York state plants and was subsequently updated in 2012 in accordance with new data provided by the New York Natural Heritage Program.

In contrast to large parks such as Central Park, which receive a substantial amount of funding from donations from the surrounding community, a majority of Inwood Hill Park's funding is provided by a combination of grants and property taxes,  common methods of funding parks in low-income areas. Partnerships for Parks, a nonprofit organization, has partnered with the city of New York to maintain and manage parks and promote their use. 

The Clean Water, Clean Air, and Green Jobs Environmental Bond Act passed as a ballot initiative in the November 2022 New York state general election,  As part of this approved initiative, New York plans to set aside 4.2 billion dollars in order to enhance, allocate and redevelop the natural landscape and environment of the state. 650 million dollars of these funds will be allocated to parks, open spaces and agricultural lands. This will involve the purchase of land for conservation, restoration/beautification of parks, and the expansion of the proportion of state-owned land. It is expected that the Clean Air, Water, and Green Jobs Environmental Bond Act will result in the creation of approximately 84,000 jobs. A six to nine month training program designed to provide employees with an understanding of the environment will be provided by the Parks Opportunities Program, and will include training on soil composition, tree types, and plant and animal species.

Fauna and Flora
The area of the park along the Harlem River includes Muscota Marsh, one of Manhattan's last remaining natural salt marshes, the other being Smuggler's Cove, which attracts large numbers of waterbirds. These waterfowl can be studied further via educational programs held at the Nature Center at the north end of the property. Mallards, Canada geese and ring-billed gulls are year-round residents, using both the water and the nearby lawns and ballfields. Many wading birds and waterfowl pass through on the spring and fall migrations, and herons and cormorants often spend the summer.  Also in the salt marsh can be found fish, mollusks and crustaceans among the cordgrass and bulrushes which can tolerate both salt and fresh water.

The woods support a wide variety of birds, including common species such as blue jays and cardinals, as well as wild turkeys. Birds of prey that breed in the park include red-tailed hawks and owls. A five-year project that began in summer 2002 attempted to reintroduce the bald eagle to Manhattan using hacking boxes in the park and eaglets brought in from the Midwest. In the first summer, three of the four introduced eaglets fledged successfully; three or four fledged each year of the program. The nesting structure was removed in 2009.

Animals found in the park include Eastern and meadow voles, red-bellied salamanders, southern flying squirrels, opossums, white-footed deer mice, and cottontail rabbits, as well as the expected eastern grey squirrels and raccoons. Foxes were also once residents, but the increasing number of coyotes spotted in Central Park and in the Bronx's Van Cortlandt Park may account for the foxes' apparent current absence.

Though the park does not support large wild mammals, the local wildlife does include raccoons and skunks as well as the usual city rodents. Both locals and people from outside the neighborhood fish from the riverbank at the north end of the park.

The park has both native and invasive plant species. While the presence of plant life is obvious, the fauna may not be as revealing.

Native and Non-Native Species 
Nursery plants native species were added to the park providing more vegetation such as Abies balsamea (L) Mill., Acer rubrum L., A. saccharum March, Aesculus Pavia L., and Betula Lenta. Non- native species were also introduced to the park affecting the native species. Some of the non-native species present were Rubus phoenicolasius maxim (classified as a rare species), Broussonetia papryifera (L) Vent., Morus alba L, and Paulownia tomentosa (Thund.) Steudel. In the 1930s, a total of 83 species were found in which 32 were non-native species and were specified by Graves, Small and field trip club.

Usage

The park contains three children's playgrounds, baseball and soccer fields, and tennis and basketball courts. The Inwood Hill Nature Center at the north end of the park is both a location for educational programs and the local headquarters of the Urban Park Rangers. Inwood Hill Park's ballfields are heavily used by local and other city leagues during the baseball season. This usage places extreme pressure on the park, which, as a result, has required more active management in recent years.

The peaceful environment of Hill Park also provides space for barbeque, dogs runs complementing, kayak, and canoe launch.  The park highlight specific activities that contribute to the park usage such as the hiking trail and the Hudson River Bike Trail. 

The lack of green space in the eastern part of Inwood and the Bronx nearby creates an enormous demand for picnicking with barbecues and table/chair setups, activity that is either illegal or tightly controlled in most city parks; however, Inwood Hill Park has managed this by permitting such setups on the manicured, maintained peninsula portion of the park.

In popular culture
The park is a central location in the science fiction novel The Orion Project, due to being a low population part of a brightly lit city.

References
Notes

Bibliography

External links 

 NYC Parks: Inwood Hill Park

Inwood, Manhattan
Nature centers in New York City
Parks in Manhattan
Urban public parks
1926 establishments in New York City
Works Progress Administration in New York City
Harlem River
Individual trees in New York City